Andy Malecek is a German guitarist who has played in the bands Fair Warning and Last Autumn's Dream.

Childhood 
Andy Malecek was born on 28 June 1964 in Berlin. He showed interest in music from a young age and took up guitar at the age of 13. His passion for music was evident as he never lost opportunities to miss classes at school so that he could play guitar. Growing up he played in several local bands.

Career

1990–2000 (fair warning) 
Andy Malecek performed, recorded and toured with Fair Warning for 10 years. In an interview with Mika Erlandson about Andy Malecek, Mika said, "One of the best guitarists that I have ever met!"

Rainmaker and Go! went Gold in Japan, while Fair Warning was nominated "Best Newcomer Band and Brightest Hope of the Year" in 1992. In 1997, Go! was nominated best album of the year.

Discography 
 1992 – Fair Warning
 1993 – Live in Japan
 1995 – Rainmaker
 1995 – Live at Home
 1997 – Go!
 1998 – Live and More
 2000 – Four

Tours 
Andy Malecek has toured with Fair Warning in Europe and Japan and has also toured alongside GIANT, Saga, Bonfire and Victory.

2002–present (Last Autumn's Dream) 
Frontiers Records announced the signing of Last Autumn's Dream self-titled debut album for the European release on 19 January 2004.

LAST AUTUMN'S DREAM is a new melodic rock super-group featuring famed Swedish singer Mikael Erlandsson together with former FAIR WARNING guitarist Andy Malecek plus the three EUROPE cohorts Mic Michaeli (on keyboards), John Leven (on bass) and Ian Haugland (on drums). The idea of this band came about when Mikael's record company in Japan proposed him to join forces with the fantastic guitar player Andy Malecek who enjoyed great success in the German hard rock band Fair Warning. Mikael and Andy were both hooked by the idea and a plan for the album began to grow. Mikael's production companies in Sweden: XTC Productions/Studio in Stockholm and Sunday Music in Gothenburg also supported the idea and they turned to Ian Haugland, Mic Michaeli and John Levén from Europe and asked if they were interested. After listening to Mikael and Andy’s new, strong material, they all decided to join in and the band Last Autumn’s Dream was born. Andy has been an active member of Last Autumn's Dream since 2002 and has performed, recorded and toured with them through several albums.

Discography 
 2003 – Last Autumn's Dream
 2005 – II
 2006 – Winter in Paradise
 2007 – Saturn Skyline
 2007 – Impressions: The Very Best of LAD (Japanese market)
 2008 – Hunting Shadows
 2008 – Live in Germany 2007
 2008 – Impressions: The Very Best of LAD (German market)
 2009 – Dreamcatcher
 2010 – A Touch of Heaven

Awards/Nominations 
In 2004, Andy Malecek made it to 8th place in an international list of favourite guitarists by BURRN! Magazine Japan.

Teaching and Session Recording 

Andy Malecek currently teaches guitar to some select students and is also active as a session musician.

Guitar Jam Tracks 

Andy is also working on a project with Jammin Heads to create Jam track videos that will be made available to the public through YouTube and downloadable instructional packages.

Personal 
Andy loves cooking and riding his bike around Berlin as a pass time when he's not practising guitar.

Living people
1964 births
German male musicians
Last Autumn's Dream members
German rock guitarists